The Soloveitchik dynasty of rabbinic scholars and their students originated the Brisker method of Talmudic study, which is embraced by their followers in the Brisk yeshivas. It is so called because of the Soloveitchiks' origin in the town of Brisk, or Brest-Litovsk, located in what is now Belarus. Many of the first Soloveitchik rabbis were the official rabbis of Brisk, and each in turn was known as "the Brisker Rov". Today, Brisk refers to several yeshivas in Israel and the United States founded by members of the Soloveitchik family.

The Soloveitchik dynasty
The Soloveitchik family includes many significant rabbinical forebears, such as Simcha Rappaport and Chaim of Volozhin, famed Talmudist and founder of the Volozhin yeshiva. Chaim of Volozhin was a student of the Vilna Gaon.

The Soloveitchik dynasty began with Rabbi Yosef Dov Soloveitchik known as the Beis HaLevi, as he was the first rabbi of Brisk surnamed Soloveitchik. More significantly, the "Brisker style" described below can already be found to some degree in the Beis HaLevi's works, which is not the case for earlier ancestors.

All members of the Soloveitchik family are descended from the Tribe of Levi and thus sometimes go by the descriptor HaLevi. The surname "Soloveitchik" comes from the word for nightingale in Slavic languages; it was chosen by the family because the primary duty of the Levites in the Temple in Jerusalem was singing.

The Beis HaLevi

Rabbi Yosef Duber Soloveitchik (1820–1892), who is known by the title of his work, Beis HaLevi, served as rabbi of Brisk for much of his life. The works on the Mishneh Torah and first five books of the Hebrew Bible which Yosef Dov Soloveitchik authored were titled Beis HaLevi (Hebrew for "House of the Levites"). Many people therefore refer to him simply as the Beis HaLevi, which also avoids the confusion with his two great-grandsons of the same name: (1) the son of Rabbi Moshe Soloveichik, Rabbi Joseph Soloveitchik (1903–1993) who moved to the United States; and (2) the son of Rabbi Yitzchak Zev Soloveitchik, Rabbi Berel Soloveitchik, who lived in Israel.

The Beis HaLevi succeeded Rabbi Yehoshua Leib Diskin as rabbi of Brisk when the latter moved to Jerusalem in 1876. The Beis HaLevi had previously served as the rabbi of Slutzk, and before that, on the faculty of the Volozhin yeshiva.

Rabbi Chaim Soloveitchik

The Beis HaLevi was succeeded as rabbi of Brisk by his son, Rabbi Chaim Soloveitchik (1853–1918). He is most commonly known as "Reb Chaim Brisker" (Rabbi Chaim from Brisk) where he implemented an analytic method of studying Talmud that focuses on precise definition/s and categorization/s of Jewish law . His primary work was Chidushei Rav Chaim HaLevi, a volume of insights on the Mishneh Torah which often would suggest novel understandings of the Talmud as well. He had three sons, Yitzchak Zev and Moshe and his oldest, Yisroel Gershon.

Rabbi Yitzchok Zev Soloveitchik

Rabbi Yitzchok Zev Soloveitchik became known as The Brisker Rov when he succeeded his father as rabbi of Brisk. He was often known by the name Velvel, a Yiddish nickname for "little wolf".  (Zev is Hebrew for "wolf".) He is also commonly known as the "GRYZ" or "HaGRYZ," an acronym for (Ha)Gaon Rabbi Yitzchak Zev''' ("[the] genius Rabbi Isaac Wolf"). He became famous enough that many people, however, refer to him simply as der Brisker Rov ("the rabbi of Brisk"). In fact, many in the Brisker yeshiva world in Israel refer to him simply as "The Rov". (In the Modern Orthodox community, his nephew, Rabbi Joseph B. Soloveitchik, is referred to as "the Rav".)

Like his father, Rabbi Yitzchok Zev Soloveitchik published works based on the Mishneh Torah, often suggesting novel insights on the Talmud in the process. He fled the Holocaust and moved to the British Mandate of Palestine. His children and grandchildren live in Israel today, and have founded several yeshivas there, all known as "Brisk", based in Jerusalem.

Rabbi Meshulam Dovid Soloveitchik
Rabbi Meshulam Dovid Soloveitchik (known as Reb Dovid) was the son of Rabbi Yitzchak Zev Soloveitchik. He was rosh yeshiva of Yeshivas Brisk  in the Gush Shemonim section of Jerusalem.like his father and grandfather he published works based on mishneh torah, and many of his lectures have been published by his students. He was considered by Briskers to be one of the last authentic remnants of a pre-World War II Jewish Lithuania. His students include the late Rabbi Moshe Twersky  Rebbi in Yeshivas Toras Moshe and Rabbi Yitzchok Lichtenstein Rosh Yeshiva of Yeshiva Torah Vodaas, both grandsons of his cousin Rabbi Joseph Ber Soloveitchik. He died on January 31, 2021, in Jerusalem, Israel.

Rabbi Berel Soloveitchik
Rabbi Berel Soloveitchik, commonly known simply as "Reb Berel," was one of the leading Brisker Rosh Yeshivas in Jerusalem, Israel. He was the son of Rabbi Yitzchak Zev, the Brisker Rav, and the cousin of Rabbi  Joseph Ber Soloveitchik. His son, Rav Avrohom Yehoshua, succeeds him as Rosh Yeshiva of Brisk in Jerusalem.

Rabbi Meir Soloveitchik
Rabbi Meir Soloveitchik was the son of Rabbi Yitzchak Zev Soloveitchik and headed one of the Brisker Yeshivas in Jerusalem, which was attended by many Torah scholars, including the current Radziner Rebbe, Grand Rabbi Moshe Leiner. He should not be confused with Rabbi Meir Soloveichik, the son of Rabbi Ahron Soloveichik's son Rabbi Eliyahu Soloveichik. He died at the age of 87 on April 2, 2016.
his yeshiva is now headed by his son Rabbi yechiel soloveitchik together with his brother rabbi avrhom soloveitchick and another yeshiva by his son reb velvil and his brother

Rabbi Velvel Soloveitchik II
Rabbi Yitzchok Zev "reb Velvel" Soloveitchik is the son of Rav Meshulam Dovid, as well as his successor as Rosh HaYeshiva of Yeshivas brisk. He carries the name of his grandfather, The Brisker Rov.

Rabbi Moshe Soloveichik

Rabbi Chaim Soloveitchik's other famous son was Rabbi Moshe Soloveichik. His works on the Rambam are known as the Chiddushei HaGram haLevi '' and "Chiddushei haGram ve'haGrid." He served as the Rabbi of Rasseyn and then of Chaslavich. He then moved to Warsaw where he served as rosh yeshiva of Tachkemoni Rabbinical Seminary. He moved to America in 1929 and was appointed as a rosh yeshiva at Rabbi Isaac Elchanan Theological Seminary (RIETS). (While RIETS has at no point ever called itself a "Brisk yeshiva" per se, it was home for many decades to Rabbi Moshe Soloveichik and later his sons.) His sons were the famous Rabbi Joseph Soloveitchik, who lived in Boston and commuted to teach Talmud at Yeshiva University in Manhattan; Dr. Samuel Soloveichik, a chemist as well as a Talmudic scholar; and Rabbi Ahron Soloveichik, who taught at Mesivta Rabbi Chaim Berlin and then at Yeshiva University. Rav Ahron founded and was the rosh yeshiva of Yeshivas Brisk in Chicago, Illinois.

Rabbi Joseph B. Soloveitchik

Rabbi Joseph B. Soloveitchik was a son of Moshe Soloveichik. He succeeded his father as the senior Rosh Yeshiva of RIETS in New York. As he rose to become an important leader of Modern Orthodox Jewry, he ordained close to 2,000 rabbis over the course of almost half a century thereby strengthening his status as "The Rav"—as he was 'the rabbis's rabbi'. He began the day school movement when he established Maimonides School as the one of the first Jewish day schools outside the New York area in 1937 after arriving in Boston with Tanya Levitt Soloveitchik in 1935 to be the mara d'atra of the greater Boston Jewish community. Today, Maimonides maintains many of the Rav's radical educational posits including co-education and female Talmud study. He is often accredited with being a primary founder of Modern Orthodoxy, a movement of Judaism which holds that Jews must both practice a Halakhic life and embrace modernity. He also gave much needed validity to the Zionist effort in his famous work "Kol Dodi Dofek". Although he was primarily a brilliant Talmudist, his most famous works of "Lonely Man of Faith", "Catharsis", "Halachic Man", and "Uvikkashtem Misham" are largely philosophical. A film called The Lonely Man of Faith: the Life and Legacy of Joseph B. Soloveitchik documents the Rav's lifework and personality in greater detail.

Rabbi Ahron Soloveichik

Rabbi Ahron Soloveichik was a son of Rabbi Moshe Soloveitchik. He taught at Mesivta Rabbi Chaim Berlin and then at Yeshiva University. He eventually moved to Chicago and became rosh yeshiva at the Hebrew Theological College and in 1974 founded his own yeshiva Yeshivas Brisk of Chicago. After his brother Joseph became ill, beginning in 1986 he began to commute to New York City to lecture at RIETS as well. Rabbi Ahron Soloveichik died in 2001, and Yeshivas Brisk of Chicago became defunct a few years later as a Mesivta but remains active today as a Beth Medrash under Rabbi Ahron's eldest son, Rabbi Moshe Soloveichik. His grandchildren include Rabbi Shmuel Marcus, philosopher Rabbi Dr. Meir Soloveichik, and political analyst Nechama Soloveichik. Rabbi Dr. David Applebaum was considered one of his most outstanding and devoted disciples.

Philosophy

General
In contrast to the Hasidic movement, all of the Soloveichik rabbis were a part of the Lithuanian yeshiva movement, and thus were strong believers in a traditional Talmudic education and, to a certain degree, intellect over emotion.  However, Rabbi Yosef Dov Soloveitchik made it clear that he was very much in touch with Hasidism, having lived for several years in Chaslavich, which was mostly Hasidic.

Halachic
The "Brisk dynasty" and their followers (known as "Briskers") are known for a tendency towards strictness in the Halacha (Jewish law); if there is ever a doubt between two rabbinic opinions, the "Brisk way" is more likely to follow the more stringent one. They maintain that we are unable to determine Halacha as following one opinion over another. They instead are stringent in the sense that they will look to fulfill the opinion of all early Halachic authorities. For example, many yeshiva students will not only not shave their payot (sidelocks), as required by the Torah, but will also let the entire area grow very long, which they tuck behind their ears- as required by certain early Halachic authorities. These are known as "Brisker Peyos", or "Briskers".

Following the Reb Velvel (the "Brisker Rav"; see above), many Briskers in Israel are very stringent in ritual tithes ("trumos uma'asros" in Hebrew). They repeat the Krias Shema many times, each time with a different possible pronunciation, in order to make sure they fulfill the Biblical command.

Talmudic
The innovative Brisk, or "conceptual", style of Talmudic analysis is described in the Brisker method article.

Political
A great deal of controversy has erupted regarding the political views of the rabbis of Brisk. Rabbi Yitzchak Zev Soloveitchik and his descendants, who settled in Israel, have made their opinion clear that they oppose a secular Zionist state and thus show no support for the Israeli government.  They do not follow anyone's lead and decide their opinions regarding the state on a case to case basis, therefore avoiding joining any political faction, including those who are anti Zionist, preferring to make an informed decision on their every interaction necessary with the state. Generally, they do not support the state but nor do they support the political anti Zionist bias. For example, they do not accept any money from the Israeli government. They are also opposed to yeshiva students having a secular college education. Turning to their forebears, Rabbi Chaim Brisker is quoted with some harsh statements against Zionism, though he lived in an era when Haredi anti-Zionism was far more prevalent. Generally speaking, however, they are viewed as the true heirs to the Brisker opinion on this matter.

In contrast, most of the Soloveitchiks who moved to the United States, including Rabbi Joseph Soloveitchik and his brother Rabbi Aaron Soloveitchik, were very supportive of the State of Israel, as well as what they perceive as a well-rounded college education. They were far more supportive than the general ultra-Orthodox American Jewry. Rabbi Joseph Soloveitchik became the accepted leader of the Modern Orthodox movement, with the yeshiva he headed, Yeshiva University, becoming the Modern Orthodox flagship institution. Rabbi Joseph Soloveitchik was the American head of Mizrachi, the organization of religious Zionists. His followers generally identify themselves with Mizrachi, and are strong supporters of the State of Israel. Rabbi Soloveitchik was even a candidate for Chief Rabbi of Tel Aviv at one point, but was outvoted by supporters for Rabbi Moshe Avigdor Amiel.

With regards to feminism, Rabbi Yosef Dov Soloveitchik was proud to point out that on his parents' wedding invitation, his grandparents are listed as "Chaim & Lifsha" on one line, with "Soloveitchik" on the next line, centered between their names. This could be seen as more feminist than the "Rabbi & Mrs. So-And-So" (or in Hebrew, "Ploni BenPloni V'Rayaso") seen in many Haredi invitations today.

Today, however, most adherents of the Israeli Soloveitchiks follow the general Israeli Haredi, i. e., strongly right-wing, worldview regarding women's role in Jewish education and communal life.  Rabbi Yosef Dov Soloveitchik, and many of his students and descendants, on the other hand, have been guardedly more open to opportunities for women, Rabbi Soloveitchik himself delivering the opening Talmud lecture at Yeshiva University's Stern College for Women.

Notes

External links
 "Rabbi Joseph B. Soloveitchik on the Brisker Method"
 Family Tree of Lithuanian Rabbis, including entire Soloveitchik branch

Haredi Judaism in Israel
Yeshivas of Belarus
Orthodox Judaism in Belarus
Jewish Russian and Soviet history
Education in Jerusalem
 
Talmud
Rabbinic dynasties
he:שיטת בריסק